Abū Sufyān Wakīʿ ibn al-Jarrāḥ ibn Malīḥ al-Ruʾāsī al-Kilābī al-Kufī (745/47–812) was a prominent hadith scholar based in Kufa. He was one of the principal teachers of the major Sunni Muslim jurist Ahmad ibn Hanbal.

Origins
Waki was born in Kufa, or in the village of Ustuwa near Nishapur, in 128/129 AH (745–747 CE). His father al-Jarrah ibn Malih belonged to the Ubayd ibn Ru'as clan of the Banu Kilab tribe and was born in Soghdia, while his mother, a daughter of Amra ibn Shaddad ibn Thawr of the same clan, was born in Bukhara; the Ubayd ibn Ru'as had been settled in Kufa following the Muslim conquest of Iraq in the 630s. The family was well off and al-Jarrah was the supervisor of the bayt al-darb (mint) at Rayy, before being appointed head of the bayt al-mal (treasury) in Baghdad under the Abbasid caliph Harun al-Rashid.

Career
Schooled in the Islamic religious sciences, especially the hadith (traditions attributed to the Islamic prophet Muhammad), Waki became a leading traditionist (muhaddith) in his hometown, known for transmitting numerous hadiths based on his memorizations. Despite the errors of transmission attributed to him, Waki was generally regarded as the best muhaddith of his time. His refusal of an appointment as qadi (head judge) by Harun al-Rashid out of concern of dependence on the state further contributed to his reputation for piety and ascetism.

Ibn Hajar al-Asqalani has mentioned a long list of his teachers and students in his work Tahdhib al-tahdhib. He transmitted hadiths on the authority of the earlier Muslim scholars Isma'il ibn Abi Khalid, Ikrima ibn Ammar, al-Awza'i, al-Amash, and Malik ibn Anas, as well as his father. Al-Dhahabi in his Siyar a`lam al-nubala has listed the names of about 20 teachers of Waki out of which the best known were Sufyan al-Thawri, Shu'ba ibn al-Ḥajjāj and Ibn Jurayj. He was among the most important teachers of Ahmad ibn Hanbal, founder and namesake of the Hanbali school of Sunni Muslim jurisprudence (fiqh). Waki himself was classified as a follower of the Hanafi fiqh of Sunni Islam.

Waki built a mosque in Kufa, installing as its imam a tribesman of his, Humayd ibn Abd al-Rahman ibn Humayd al-Ru'asi.

Death and descendants
On his return from the Hajj (pilgrimage to Mecca), Waki died in the Fayd oasis in 197 AH (812). His son Sufyan was also a Kufan traditionist, though of poor reputation. Sufyan died at an old age in 861.

Literary works
Although Waki was popularly held to have never possessed a book, he authored a number of works:
Tafsir al-Quran
al-Sunan
al-Marifa Wa al-Tarikh
al-Musannaf (cited by Ahmad ibn Hanbal and Ibn Hajar al-Asqalani)
al-Zuhd (a copy of which is preserved in the al-Zahiriyah Library Library of Damascus)
Kitab al-salat, of which just one page survived on a papyrus leaf

References

Bibliography

746 births
812 deaths
8th-century Arabs
Banu Kilab
Hanafi fiqh scholars
Muslim ascetics
People from Kufa
People from Nishapur
Taba‘ at-Tabi‘in hadith narrators